The British Rail Class 485 (or 4Vec, later 5Vec) and British Rail Class 486 (or 3Tis, later 2Tis) electrical multiple units were originally built for the London Electric Railway from 1923-31 as its 'Standard' tube stock. They were purchased by British Rail in 1967 and transported to the Isle of Wight to work 'mainline' services on the newly electrified Ryde to Shanklin line, where they worked for an additional quarter of a century. At the time of their purchase the units had already worked for over 40 years on the London Underground, but their introduction allowed the last steam locomotives on the line to be withdrawn.

History 
Six four-car sets and six three-car sets were refurbished by BR's Stewarts Lane depot in 1966-67. The four-car sets were initially classified Class 452 and numbered 041-046, later reclassified Class 485 and numbered 485041-046. Each unit was formed of a driving motor, two intermediate trailers, and a second driving motor. Thus, the formation was DMBSO+TSO+TSO+DMBSO. Some of the intermediate trailers were former driving trailers, with the cabs locked out of use.

The three-car sets were classified Class 451 and numbered 031-036, later reclassified Class 486 and numbered 486031-036. A spare driving motor car was also refurbished, given the unit number 486037. Each of these units were formed of a driving motor, an intermediate trailer, and a driving trailer. Thus, the formation was DMBSO+TSO+DTSO.

When introduced, the units carried all-over BR blue livery. This progressed to standard blue/grey livery in the 1970s, and finally some units received Network SouthEast's blue livery with red and white stripes, following its introduction in 1986.

Electric services on the Isle of Wight commenced on 20 March 1967. In service, the 4Vec units often worked alone, but sometimes in combination with a 3Tis unit, such that a train was formed of seven coaches known as a 7 Vectis. ("Vectis" was the Roman name for the Isle of Wight.)

Reformation
In 1985, the Class 485 units were reformed into five 5 car (5Vec) units, and the Class 486 units into two 2 car (2tis) units.

Withdrawal
Due to the proximity to the sea, the units suffered badly from corrosion damage. By the mid-1980s it was clear that they needed to be replaced. The replacements came from the two-car Class 483, which were also rebuilt from former London Underground stock, namely 1938 tube stock. These new units were introduced from 1989. The last 2Tis and 5Vec units were withdrawn from service in 1992.

Upon retirement from Isle of Wight services, no 486 units were saved for preservation. However, several 485 vehicles were sold back to London Underground for eventual restoration as part of an operational 'Standard' stock museum unit. These are listed below:

Of these five cars, only DTSO 5279 and TSO 7296 have been preserved, all the other cars were scrapped in Acton works in 2013 alongside other old Standard Stock Cars. During November 2011 the two long-stored DM vehicles 2 and 7 were despatched by LU to Eastleigh depot for component recovery and subsequent breaking up: this is believed to have occurred in December 2011 (although this has not been confirmed). Trailers 27 and 49 are incorporated into the LT museum's Standard stock museum train. Trailer 44 was scrapped in August 2012.

Fleet details

Notes

References

Sources

Bibliography

Further reading

External links 

485
Train-related introductions in 1967
Rail transport on the Isle of Wight
Metropolitan Cammell multiple units